Curd Gustav Andreas Gottlieb Franz Jürgens (13 December 191518 June 1982) was a German-Austrian stage and film actor. He was usually billed in English-speaking films as Curt Jurgens. He was well known for playing Ernst Udet in Des Teufels General. His English-language roles include James Bond villain Karl Stromberg in The Spy Who Loved Me (1977), Éric Carradine in And God Created Woman (1956), and Professor Immanuel Rath in The Blue Angel (1959).

Early life
Jürgens was born on 13 December 1915 in the Munich borough of Solln, Kingdom of Bavaria, German Empire. His father, Kurt, was a trader from Hamburg, and his mother, Marie-Albertine, was a French teacher. He had two elder twin sisters, Jeanette and Marguerite. He began his working career as a journalist before becoming an actor at the urging of his actress wife, Louise Basler. He spent much of his early acting career on the stage in Vienna. Due to serious injuries that he sustained in a car accident in the summer of 1933, he was unable to have children.

Jürgens was critical of Nazism in his native Germany. In 1944, after filming Wiener Mädeln, he got into an argument with Robert Kaltenbrunner (brother of high-ranking Austrian SS official Ernst Kaltenbrunner), SS-Obersturmbannführer Otto Skorzeny and a member of Baldur von Schirach's staff in a Viennese bar without knowing who they were. After this event, Jürgens was sent to a labor camp for the "politically unreliable" in Hungary. After a few weeks he managed to escape and went into hiding. Jürgens became an Austrian citizen after the war.

Career

Jürgens went on to play soldiers in many war films. Notable performances in this vein include his breakthrough screen role in Des Teufels General (1955, The Devil's General), a fictional portrayal of World War I flying ace and World War II Luftwaffe general Ernst Udet, followed by Roger Vadim's film Et Dieu... créa la femme (And God Created Woman) starring Brigitte Bardot.

Jürgens' first Hollywood film was The Enemy Below (1957), in which he portrayed a German U-boat commander. In 1962, he played the German general Günther Blumentritt in The Longest Day (1962). Later, in the James Bond film The Spy Who Loved Me (1977), he played the villain Karl Stromberg, a sociopathic industrialist seeking to transform the world into an ocean paradise. His last film appearance was as Maître Legraine, beside Alain Delon and Claude Jade in the spy-thriller Teheran 43 (1981). In English-language television, he played Chancellor Otto von Bismarck in several episodes of the BBC series Fall of Eagles (1974) and appeared as General Vladimir in the BBC's Smiley's People (1982).

Although he appeared in over 100 films, Jürgens was also a notable stage actor. He was member of several theatres in Vienna (Volkstheater 1938–1941, Burgtheater 1940–1953 and 1965–1968, and others). He played the title role of Hugo von Hofmannsthal's play Jedermann at the Salzburg Festival from 1973 until 1977 – arguably the most high-profile role for a German-speaking male actor. In 1966 he appeared in a short run on Broadway at the Eugene O'Neill Theatre opposite Geraldine Page, directed by George Schaefer.

His last stage appearance was with the Vienna State Opera on 9 March 1981 as Bassa Selim in Mozart's opera Die Entführung aus dem Serail. He also directed a few films with limited success, e.g. Bankraub in der Rue Latour, and wrote screenplays, e.g. Bonus on Death.

He titled his 1976 memoir ... und kein bißchen weise (And Not At All Wise).

Jürgens provided the German voice of the journalist in the 1980 German dub of Jeff Wayne's Musical Version of the War of the Worlds.

Personal life
Jürgens maintained a home in France, but frequently returned to Vienna to perform on stage. He died there from a heart attack on 18 June 1982. He had suffered a heart attack several years before. During this he had a near-death experience where he claimed he died and went to hell. Jürgens was interred in the Vienna Central Cemetery.

Brigitte Bardot nicknamed him "the Norman Wardrobe" during their work for Et Dieu... créa la femme.

In the summer of 1957 Jürgens had a short but intense affair with actress Romy Schneider.

Jürgens was married to:
 Lulu Basler, actress (15 June 1937 – 8 October 1947) (divorced)
 Judith Holzmeister (16 October 1947 – 1955) (divorced)
 Eva Bartok (13 August 1955 – 1956) (divorced)
 Simone Bicheron (14 September 1958 – 1977) (divorced)
 Margie Schmitz (21 March 1978 – 18 June 1982) (his death)

Partial filmography

 The Royal Waltz (1935), as Kaiser Franz Joseph of Austria (Jürgens' first film)
Family Parade (1936), as Graf Erik Stjernenhö
The Unknown (1936), as Hans Wellenkamp
Love Can Lie (1937), as Student Holger Engström
To New Shores (1937), as Bobby Wells' Friend
Tango Notturno (1937), as Friend of Jac, Musician (uncredited)
The Girl of Last Night (1938), as Die drei Attachés (uncredited)
 (1939), as Prinz Heinrich Karl
Weltrekord im Seitensprung (1940), as Peter Enderlein, Kapellmeister
Herz ohne Heimat (1940), as Bob (uncredited)
Operetta (1940), as Karl Millöcker
Stimme des Herzens (1942), as Volontär Drews
Whom the Gods Love (1942), as Emperor Joseph II
Women Are No Angels (1943), as Bandini
Ein glücklicher Mensch (1943), as Petersen
 (1944), as Dr. Erich Thienwiebel
 (1944), as Wolfgang Schwab
The Singing House (1948), as Bandleader Hans Storch
 (1948), as Prinz Bernardo
The Angel with the Trumpet (1948), as Graf Leopold Thraun
On Resonant Shores (1948), as Stefan Keller

 The Heavenly Waltz (1948), as Clemens M. Weidenauer
 (1948), as George Miller
 (1949), as Dr. Kurt Walla
 Lambert Feels Threatened (1949), as Kommissar Roland
 (1949), as Heinz Wagner
Viennese Girls (1949), as Graf Lechenberg
Bonus on Death (1950), as Gunarson, Opera Tenor
Der Schuß durchs Fenster (1950)
Kissing Is No Sin (1950), as Kammersänger Felix Alberti
The Disturbed Wedding Night (1950), as Lawrence Vinning
A Rare Lover (1950), as Sascha Borotraz
 (1951), as Jean Langrand
 (1951), as Conductor Felix Adrian
 (1951), as Architect Reinhold
 (1951), as Kommissar
House of Life (1952), as Axel Jolander
Knall and Fall, as Imposters (1952), as John Vandergold
1. April 2000 (1952), as Capitano Herakles
Rose of the Mountain (1952), as Composer Jack Long
 (1953), as Toni Brandstetter
They Call It Love (1953), as Peter Malmö
Music by Night (1953), as Hans Kersten
The Last Waltz (1953), as Rittmeister Graf Sarassow
Everything for Father (1953), as Clemens Haberland
 (1954), as Pat
A Woman of Today (1954), as Heinz Bender
Circus of Love (1954), as Toni
Prisoners of Love (1954), as Willi Kluge
Orient Express (1954), as Bate
The Confession of Ina Kahr (1954), as Paul Kahr
 (1955), as Stefan Selby
Des Teufels General (1955), as Gen. Harry Harras
Love Without Illusions (1955), as Walter
Die Ratten (1955), as Bruno Mechelke
Heroes and Sinners (1955), as Wolf Gerke
 (1955), as Gerd
Devil in Silk (1956), as Thomas Ritter
The Golden Bridge (1956), as Balder
Without You All Is Darkness (1956), as Dr. Robert Kessler
And God Created Woman (1956), as Eric Carradine
The House of Intrigue (1956), as Colonel Bernes
Michael Strogoff (1956), as Michel Strogoff
Bitter Victory (1957), as Major Brand
 (1957), as Dr. Walter
Les Espions (1957), as Alex
The Enemy Below (1957), as Von Stolberg
Tamango (1958), as Captain John Reinker
This Happy Feeling (1958), as Preston Mitchell
Me and the Colonel (1958), as Colonel Prokoszny
The Inn of the Sixth Happiness (1958), as Captain Lin Nan
Der Schinderhannes (1958), as Johann 'Schinderhannes' Bückler
 (1959), as Eric Muller
Ferry to Hong Kong (1959), as Mark Bertram Conrad
The Blue Angel (1959), as Professor Immanuel Rath
Magnificent Sinner (1959), as Czar Alexander II
I Aim at the Stars (1960), as Wernher von Braun
Brainwashed (1960), as Werner von Basil
Gustav Adolf's Page (1960), as King Gustav Adolf
Bankraub in der Rue Latour (1961), as Cliff MacHardy
Girl in a Suitcase (1961), as Rich Guy in Boat (uncredited)
 The Triumph of Michael Strogoff (1961), as Michel Strogoff
Disorder (1962), as Carlo's Father
The Longest Day (1962), as General Günther Blumentritt
I Don Giovanni della Costa Azzurra (1962), as Mr. Edmond
 (1963), as Captain Macheath
Miracle of the White Stallions (1963), as Gen. Tellheim
Of Love and Desire (1963), as Paul Beckmann
Nutty, Naughty Chateau (1963), as Hugo Falsen
Hide and Seek (1964), as Hubert Marek
Encounter in Salzburg (1964), as Hans Wilke, General Director
Les Parias de la gloire (1964), as Ludwig Goetz
Psyche 59 (1964), as Eric Crawford
 (1965), as Kurt Lehnert
Lord Jim (1965), as Cornelius
Who Wants to Sleep? (1965), as Stefan von Cramer
 (1966), as Dave O'Connor
 (1966), as Czar Alexander I
Target for Killing (1966), as Gérard van Looch / Giant
The Gardener of Argenteuil (1966), as The Baron
Dirty Heroes (1967), as General Edwin von Keist
The Karate Killers (1967), as Carl von Kessen
 (1967), as The Cardinal
OSS 117 – Double Agent (1968), as Il Maggiore
The Doctor of St. Pauli (1968), as Dr. Jan Diffring
 (1968, TV miniseries), as Babeck
The Assassination Bureau (1969), as Gen. von Pinck
Battle of the Commandos (1969), as Gen. von Reilow
On the Reeperbahn at Half Past Midnight (1969), as Hannes Teversen
Battle of Britain (1969), as Baron von Richter
Battle of Neretva (1969), as Lohring
Slap in the Face (1970), as Thomas Nathan Terbanks
Hotel by the Hour (1970), as Kommissar Canisius
The Invincible Six (1970), as Baron
Hello-Goodbye (1970), as Baron De Choisis
The Priest of St. Pauli (1970), as Konrad Johannsen
Cannabis (1970), as Henri Emery
The Mephisto Waltz (1971), as Duncan Mowbray Ely
 (1971), as Captain Markus Jolly
Nicholas and Alexandra (1971), as the German Consul to Switzerland
Fieras sin jaula (1971), as Ronald Marvelling
Kill! Kill! Kill! Kill! (1971), as Grueningen
 (1972), as Russian general
Der Kommissar (TV) (1972–1973), as Harald Bergmann / Dr. Hochstätter
The Vault of Horror (1973), as Sebastian (segment 3 "This Trick'll Kill You")
Profession: Adventurers (1973), as Alvarez
Soft Beds, Hard Battles (1974), as General Von Grotjahn
Fall of Eagles (TV, 1974), as Otto von Bismarck
Radiografia di una Svastika (1974)
Cagliostro (1975), as Cardinal Braschi
Derrick – Season 2, episode 4: "Madeira" (1975), as Paul Bubach
 (1975), as Fox
Povero Cristo (1975), as Man Engaging Giorgio
The Mimosa Wants to Blossom Too (1976), as Josef Popov
 (1976), as Senator Shelton
The Twist (1976), as Le bijoutier / Jeweller
The Spy Who Loved Me (1977), as Karl Stromberg
Schöner Gigolo, armer Gigolo (1978), as Prince
Breakthrough (1979), as Gen. Hofmann
Missile X: The Neutron Bomb Incident (1979) (also known as Teheran Incident and Cruise Missile), as Baron Marchant 
Goldengirl (1979), as Dr. Serafin
 (1979), Cameo (uncredited)
La Gueule de l'autre (1979), as Wilfrid
 (1980), as UFO Commander
The Sleep of Death (1980), as Count St. Alyre
Teheran 43 (1981), as Maître Legraine
 (TV film, 1981), as Hans Collin
Smiley's People (BBC TV, 1982), as General Vladimir (final film role)

References

External links

 
  (as Curt Jurgens)
 Curd Jürgens Estate at Deutsches Filminstitut, Frankfurt am Main

1915 births
1982 deaths
20th-century Austrian male actors
20th-century German male actors
Austrian male film actors
Austrian male stage actors
Austrian male television actors
Burials at the Vienna Central Cemetery
Commanders Crosses of the Order of Merit of the Federal Republic of Germany
German emigrants to Austria
German male film actors
German male stage actors
German male television actors
German people of French descent
Male actors from Munich
Naturalised citizens of Austria
Volpi Cup for Best Actor winners